London Buses route 2 is a Transport for London contracted bus route in London, England. Running between Norwood garage and Marylebone station, it is operated by Arriva London.

History

Route 2 was the last West End bus route that was operated by step-entrance buses other than AEC Routemasters. Ironically, it was also the first London bus route to use the Routemaster.

In the 1950s, the route was run using AEC Regent IIIs. On 8 February 1956, the first prototype AEC Routemaster ran on route 2 between Golders Green and Crystal Palace and after undergoing modifications the following year, it passed to route 260. On 29 January 1994, route 2 was converted to one man operation with the AEC Routemasters replaced by Leyland Olympians and MCW Metrobuses.

In 2003, brand new Alexander ALX400 bodied Volvo B7TLs were introduced. Conversion to the type took place a few months before the contract was renewed. 

In 2015, the route received a part allocation of Enviro 400's from route 341. Some of its longer 10.6 metre Volvo B7TL's were transferred to Edmonton Garage for use on route 123.

It is operated out of Norwood garage with a peak vehicle requirement of 24 buses.

In 2021, the peak frequency of the service was reduced from eight buses per hour to seven.

Current route
Route 2 operates via these primary locations:
Norwood Garage
West Norwood station 
Tulse Hill station 
Brixton station 
Stockwell station 
Vauxhall bus station  
Vauxhall Bridge
Bessborough Gardens for Pimlico station 
Victoria station  
Hyde Park Corner station 
Marble Arch station 
Baker Street station 
Marylebone station

References

External links

Timetable

Bus routes in London
Transport in the London Borough of Croydon
Transport in the London Borough of Lambeth
Transport in the City of Westminster